The 2008 Allan Cup was the Canadian championship of senior ice hockey, and the 100th year that the Allan Cup has been awarded.  The 2008 tournament was hosted by the City of Brantford, Ontario, and the Brantford Blast of the Ontario Hockey Association's Major League Hockey.  The tournament began on April 14, 2008, and concluded April 19, 2008.

Information
Ontario was represented by two different teams in the 2008 Allan Cup, not including the hosts.  The Whitby Dunlops represented the Ontario Hockey Federation as a whole by winning the Robertson Cup grand championship, played between the winners of Major League Hockey and the Eastern Ontario Senior Hockey League.  The other representatives were the Dundas Real McCoys, who despite losing the Robertson Cup to the Dunlops received a second chance at the Allan Cup because they pushed through to the Greater Ontario championship, the Renwick Cup and defeated Hockey Northwestern Ontario's Thunder Bay Hawks.  The reason for the second representative being awarded was due to a lack of a Maritime entry in the Senior "AAA" ranks for the season.

Tournament

Round Robin

Results

Elimination round

Final

References

External links

Administration
Official Allan Cup website 
Official Hockey Canada website

Teams
Brantford Blast
Dundas Real McCoys
Shawinigan Xtreme
Whitby Dunlops

Leagues
Chinook Hockey League
Eastern Ontario Senior Hockey League
Major League Hockey
Quebec Central Hockey League
Wild Goose Hockey League

Allan Cup
Allan Cup
Sport in Brantford